1688 Revolution may refer to
Glorious Revolution, the overthrow of King James II of England
Siamese revolution of 1688, the overthrow of pro-foreign Siamese King Narai